The 2015 Argentina Open was a men's tennis tournament played on outdoor clay courts. It was the 18th edition of the ATP Buenos Aires event, and part of the ATP World Tour 250 series of the 2015 ATP World Tour. It took place in Buenos Aires, Argentina, from 23 February through 1 March 2015. Rafael Nadal won the singles title.

Points and prize money

Point distribution

Prize money

Singles main draw entrants

Seeds 

 Rankings are as of February 16, 2015.

Other entrants 
The following players received wildcards into the main draw:
 Guido Andreozzi
 Renzo Olivo
 Horacio Zeballos

The following players received entry from the qualifying draw:
 Facundo Argüello
 Facundo Bagnis
 Marco Cecchinato
 Andrés Molteni

Retirements 
 Pablo Carreño Busta (illness)

Doubles main draw entrants

Seeds 

1 Rankings are as of February 16, 2015.

Other entrants 
The following pairs received wildcards into the main draw:
 Facundo Argüello /  Pedro Cachín
 Federico Delbonis /  Andrés Molteni

Withdrawals
During the tournament
 Fabio Fognini (illness)

Finals

Singles 

  Rafael Nadal defeated  Juan Mónaco, 6–4, 6–1

Doubles 

  Jarkko Nieminen /  André Sá defeated  Pablo Andújar /  Oliver Marach, 4–6, 6–4, [10–7]

References

External links 

 

Argentina Open
ATP Buenos Aires
Argentina Open
Argentina Open
Argentina Open